Luca Pagliarulo (born 6 September 1983 in Foggia) is an Italian footballer. He currently plays for Serie D team Dattilo, and is mostly known for having played for Trapani Calcio between 2010 and 2020.

References

External links 

1983 births
Living people
Italian footballers
Calcio Foggia 1920 players
F.C. Canavese players
Trapani Calcio players
Serie B players
Serie C players
Association football defenders